"Oh Julie" is a song written by Noel Ball and Ken Moffitt and performed by The Crescendos featuring Janice Green. It reached #4 on the U.S. R&B chart and #5 on the U.S. pop chart in 1959.

The single ranked #47 on Billboard's Year-End top 50 singles of 1958.

Other versions
Otis Williams and the Charms released a version of the song as the B-side to their 1957 single "Could This Be Magic".
Jan and Dean released a version of the song as the B-side to their 1961 single "Don't Fly Away".
Dale Ward featuring Robin Ward released a version of the song as the B-side] to their 1963 single "Letter from Sherry".

References

1957 songs
1957 singles
Jan and Dean songs